The 63rd Infantry Regiment was a Regular infantry regiment in the United States Army.

Lineage
Constituted on 15 May 1917 in the Regular Army as the 63rd Infantry. Organized on 1 June 1917 at the Presidio of San Francisco, California, from personnel of the 12th Infantry Regiment. Assigned to the 11th Division on 5 July 1918. Relieved from  the 11th Division on 29 November 1918. Demobilized on 31 July 1922 at Plattsburg Barracks, New York.

Reconstituted in the Regular Army on 10 May 1941. Assigned to the 6th Infantry Division, and concurrently activated at Fort Leonard Wood, Missouri on 1 June 1941. Inactivated on 10 January 1949 in Korea. Activated on 4 October 1950 at Fort Ord, California. Inactivated on 3 April 1956 at Fort Ord.

Campaign streamers
World War II
 New Guinea
 Luzon (with arrowhead)

Decorations
 Presidential Unit Citation Streamer embroidered MOUNT SANTO DOMINGO (2nd Battalion cited)
 Presidential Unit Citation Streamer embroidered MONTALBAN LUZON (3rd Battalion cited)
 Philippine Presidential Unit Citation Streamer embroidered 17 OCTOBER 1944 to 4 JULY 1945

Distinctive unit Insignia
The shield of the COA.

Coat of arms
The shield is Infantry blue with demi-sun. A rising sun is on the arms of the state of New York, and California is the state of the setting sun. The 63rd Infantry was originally organized in California and after World War I performed guard duty in New York state. The 12th Infantry from which the personnel were drawn, is indicated by the canton

See also
 Distinctive unit insignia

References

External links
 http://www.history.army.mil/html/forcestruc/lh.html
 http://6thinfantry.com/

063
United States Army regiments of World War I